George Daniel Bîrligea (born 19 April 2000) is a Romanian professional footballer who plays as a forward for Liga I club CFR Cluj.

Club career

Early career / Teramo
Born in Brăila, Bîrligea moved to Italy at age 12 with his mother and elder sister, where he represented ASD Cantera Ribolla and Palermo at junior level.

On 22 January 2020, Bîrligea made his Serie C debut for Teramo in a 1–0 win over Catanzaro. Over the course of two years with Il diavolo, he amassed seven goals from 43 appearances in all competitions.

CFR Cluj
On 26 January 2022, Bîrligea returned to Romania after agreeing to a contract with defending champions CFR Cluj. He made his debut on 5 February, coming on as a 87th-minute substitute for Claudiu Petrila in a 1–1 Liga I draw at Universitatea Craiova.

Bîrligea scored his first goal for "the White and Burgundies" on 1 May 2022, in a 1–0 league defeat of Farul Constanța. Two weeks later, he started in a 2–1 home victory over Universitatea Craiova, as his club was crowned national champion one fixture prior to the end of the season.

On 10 November 2022, Bîrligea scored his first career hat-trick in a 5–0 defeat of Dumbrăvița counting for the Cupa României group stage.

International career
Bîrligea made his debut for the Romania national under-21 team on 25 March 2022, equalising late in an eventual 2–1 friendly win against Finland at the Stadionul Arcul de Triumf in Bucharest.

Career statistics

Club

Honours
CFR Cluj
Liga I: 2021–22
Supercupa României runner-up: 2022

References

External links
Daniel Bîrligea at Liga Profesionistă de Fotbal 

2000 births
Living people
Sportspeople from Brăila
Romanian emigrants to Italy
Romanian footballers
Association football forwards
Serie C players
S.S. Teramo Calcio players
Liga I players
CFR Cluj players
Romania under-21 international footballers
Romanian expatriate footballers
Expatriate footballers in Italy
Romanian expatriate sportspeople in Italy